The 2021 Gulf Western Oils Touring Car Masters was an Australian motor racing competition for touring cars manufactured between 1 January 1963 and the 31 December 1980 and IROC Porsche Class Automobiles, which had been modified in accordance with the series regulations. It was sanctioned by Motorsport Australia as an Authorised Series, with TCM Racing Pty. Ltd appointed as the Category Manager for the series.

John Bowe won the series, his sixth Touring Car Masters title.

Calendar
The series was contested over four rounds.

Entries

Teams and Drivers

Key

Series summary
The series was won by John Bowe, in what was his sixth Touring Car Masters title win and his first since 2016. Driving a Holden Torana, Bowe won the final round of the series at Mount Panorama Circuit, Bathurst, New South Wales to finish the season on 597 points. Ryan Hansford placed second on 547 points with Steven Johnson third on 497 points. Bowe completed all races held during the series with one win, at Symmons Plains, earlier in the season.

Series results

Series standings

References

External links
 

Touring Car Masters
Touring car racing series
Touring Car Masters